Bimbilla is one of the constituencies represented in the Parliament of Ghana. It elects one Member of Parliament (MP) by the first past the post system of election. Bimbilla is located in the Nanumba North district of the Northern Region of Ghana.

Boundaries
The seat is located entirely within the Nanumba North district of the Northern Region of Ghana.

Members of Parliament

Elections

See also
List of Ghana Parliament constituencies

Notes

References 

Parliamentary constituencies in the Northern Region (Ghana)